Jodie Scholz is an American television soap opera script writer and editor.

Positions held
Days of Our Lives
 Script Writer: October 3, 2003 - April 2009
 Script Editor: May 16, 2005 - July 21, 2005

Port Charles (hired by Scott Hamner)
Script Writer: 1999 - 2003

Sunset Beach
 Script Writer: 1999
 Writer’s Assistant: 1997 - 1998

References

External links

American soap opera writers
Living people
Year of birth missing (living people)
Place of birth missing (living people)